King William Street may refer to:

King William Street, Adelaide in Adelaide, South Australia
King William Street (Hamilton, Ontario) in Hamilton, Ontario
King William Street, London in London, United Kingdom
King William Street tube station, a closed London Underground station

See also
 William Street (disambiguation)
 King William (disambiguation)